Sinapyl alcohol is an organic compound structurally related to cinnamic acid.  It is biosynthetized via the phenylpropanoid biochemical pathway, its immediate precursor being sinapaldehyde.  This phytochemical is one of the monolignols, which are precursor to lignin or lignans. It is also a biosynthetic precursor to various stilbenoids and coumarins.

See also 

Sinapinic acid
Syringol
Syringaldehyde
Syringic acid
Acetosyringone
Sinapine
Canolol
Phenolic content in wine

References

Monolignols
Ethers